Karol Zine (previously Harshali Zine) is an Indian television actress. She has acted in various Indian television shows including Hitler Didi, Diya Aur Baati Hum, CID, Fear Files: Darr Ki Sacchi Tasvirein, Savdhaan India, Haunted Nights, Ishq Kills, Kismat Connection, Aahat, and Bhanwar (the 2015 second season).

Television
for Zee TV:
Hitler Didi
Fear Files: Darr Ki Sacchi Tasvirein
for Star Plus:
Diya Aur Baati Hum
Ishq Kills
for Sony TV:
CID
Aahat
Bhanwar (2015 second season)
for Life OK:
Savdhaan India
for Sahara One:
Haunted Nights
Kismat Connection
for ALT Balaji:
BOSS: Baap of Special Services, as Komal

References

Living people
Indian television actresses
Actresses in Hindi television
Actresses from Mumbai
Year of birth missing (living people)